Brynja McDivitt Booth (born June 10, 1972) is an American lawyer from Maryland who is a Justice of the Supreme Court of Maryland .

Education 

Booth received her Bachelor of Arts from Bucknell University, cum laude, and her Juris Doctor from Washington and Lee University School of Law, cum laude.

Legal career 

Upon graduating law school, she served as a law clerk for Judge William S. Horne of the Talbot County Circuit Court. From 1997–2000, Booth was an associate with Cowdrey, Thompson & Karsten, PA; she served as a shareholder from 2000–2003. From 2003–2008, she was with Cowdrey, Thompson & Karsten, PC and from 2003–2008 she was with Cowdrey Thompson, P.C..  Prior to her appointment to the court, Booth was an attorney and shareholder of Booth, Booth, Cropper & Marriner, P.C. and has extensive appellate experience. Since 2016, she has served as the president of the Maryland Municipal Attorneys Association.

Appointment to the Supreme Court of Maryland 

On March 12, 2019, Governor Larry Hogan announced his appointment of Booth to the Supreme Court of Maryland. On March 22, 2019, her appointment was confirmed by the Maryland Senate. She took her seat on April 18, 2019. She had a formal investiture on July 11, 2019.

Personal life 

Booth and her husband Curt live with their two children in Easton, Maryland. She is active at The Country School and in St. Marks United Methodist Church in Easton.

References

External links 

1972 births
Living people
20th-century American lawyers
21st-century American judges
21st-century American lawyers
Bucknell University alumni
Judges of the Maryland Court of Appeals
People from Olean, New York
Washington and Lee University School of Law alumni
20th-century American women lawyers
21st-century American women lawyers
21st-century American women judges